Prof (Dr). T. LAZAR MATHEW, B. V.Sc; M.Sc. (Med); Ph.D; D.Sc; FABMS., FIMSA., FISI., FAMS (born  ) is currently Senior Advisor at Manipal University. He has over 5 decades of experience in teaching, research and technology management. He worked as Director of 3 establishments (Life Sciences, DEBEL & INMAS) of Defence Research & Development Organization. After retirement, he was Director of a mission hospital at Ajmer and Dean and Director at VIT, Vellore. He was Sr.Advisor at PSG Institute of Advanced Studies, IIT Bombay and IIEST Kolkata; and was Pro Vice Chancellor, Karunya Institute of Technology and Sciences. He was instrumental to establish High Altitude Medical Research Centre at Leh, Society for Biomedical Technology, an internationally recognised Rural AIDS Facility and Centre for Biomedical Research, at varying periods. The document, ‘Indian Medical Devices Regulatory Authority ‘prepared by him formed the basis for the Parliamentary Act. He has 205 research Publications, 3 technical books, 12 patents and several awards to his credit. He has been Chairman of various scientific Committees of Govt, of India and represented our country as leader/member of various technical delegations abroad. He has been a respected teacher and examiner for M.B.B.S., B.D.S., B.Tech., M.Sc., M.Tech, Ph.D. for 5 Universities. He has delivered several keynote lectures, inaugural and convocation addresses. He has been a Visiting Professor in 3 Universities abroad in the area of Medical Technology and Biotechnology for Brief Periods. He is passionate about indigenous development of medical devices.

Living people
Indian medical researchers
University of Mysore alumni
Fellows of the National Academy of Medical Sciences
1942 births